IceStone, LLC is a Brooklyn, New York manufacturer of durable surfaces composed of recycled glass and cement. IceStone's eponymous surface is marketed as a sustainable alternative to conventional stone surfaces, and is typically fabricated into countertops, backsplashes, and bathroom vanities. IceStone is one of twenty companies in the world (and the only durable surface manufacturer) to hold a Cradle to Cradle Silver certification. The surface is currently on display at the Cooper-Hewitt National Design Museum's 2010 Triennial exhibition.

History

Foundation 
IceStone, LLC was founded in 2003 by Brooklyn entrepreneurs Miranda Magagnini and Peter Strugatz, who discovered a struggling company that had developed a terrazzo-style material made of recycled glass and cement but had never brought it to market. After securing the rights to the company at a public auction, they dubbed the new enterprise "IceStone" for the glossy appearance of the surface and began renovating a  factory in the Brooklyn Navy Yard. With capital from angel investors such as Ben Cohen from Ben & Jerry's, Dal LaMagna founder of Tweezerman, and Greg Steltenpohl from Odwalla, Strugatz and Magagnini developed the product, filed for a patent on the manufacturing process, and began branding IceStone for commercial distribution.

Growth 
The first test batches of IceStone were initially prone to cracking due to product development challenges. However, the company quickly refined their formulas to eliminate these problems, established a color palette of eighteen colors, and began marketing the slabs to local showrooms. By late 2003, IceStone had been specified for several projects in the New York area, benefiting from increasing demand for green building projects in the U.S. led by government incentives. A combination of press from its first projects and increased demand enabled the company to expand its operations to achieve nationwide distribution, a broader color palette (currently 29 colors), and a larger workforce. In 2006, IceStone was named one of Inc. Magazine's "Green 50" companies, and in October 2007, IceStone was featured on the PBS show This Old House. IceStone's Refined Collection of colors received a 2009 Best of Year Merit Award from Interior Design magazine, and a 2010 Bloom Award for "Innovative Materials" from ASID and Interiors & Sources magazine.

IceStone has developed its customer base to include Starbucks, NASA, the Ritz-Carlton, Whole Foods, and Amazon. IceStone was specified for the Bank of America Tower in Midtown Manhattan, which was completed in 2009. The Gates Foundation also specified IceStone for its new Seattle headquarters to open in 2011.

Sustainability

Product 
Depending on the color, IceStone is 68%-75% recycled glass, 15-20% white Portland cement, and small percentages of pigments and proprietary ingredients. The glass used is 100% recycled. The surface contains no petrochemicals, resins, or VOCs; IceStone's marketing material distinguishes its product from engineered stone countertops like quartz surfaces, which are typically made with synthetic resins. According to the Care & Maintenance guidelines on IceStone's website, the surface is semi-porous due to its cement content and requires regular application of a penetrating sealer. IceStone addressed these concerns when it rolled out its improved surfaces in 2019 which no longer need to be sealed or treated by customers.

Facility & employees  
IceStone operates out of a day-lit  facility in the Brooklyn Navy Yard. The company maintains a low-heat manufacturing process with a greywater recycling system that reclaims approximately 90% of the water used. It also uses soy-based lubricants for its machines to reduce dependence on petroleum.

IceStone promotes itself as a triple bottom line company, and is described as such by curator Matilda McQuaid of the Cooper-Hewitt Design Museum. She writes, "Besides health benefits and living wages, workers receive immigration assistance and life-skill training programs. Monthly town meetings further enhance the culture of inclusion." 
IceStone is also a founding member of the Certified B Corporations.

Criticism 
IceStone has received some minor criticism over its maintenance guidelines, which recommend that the surface be resealed twice a year and waxed three times a year to avoid etches and stains. New York House Magazine gave IceStone an honorable mention in Recycled Content and Design for its 2010 Innovative Green Design Awards, but the award description suggests that IceStone's required maintenance is too frequent. IceStone maintains that it requires no more care than natural stone surfaces. In 2019, IceStone implemented a new manufacturing process that means that its surfaces no longer have to be sealed or treated by their customers.

References

External links 
 IceStone Official Website
 MBDC Cradle to Cradle Certification
 A Flooded Manufacturer Rebounds After Hurricane Sandy  April 12, 2013 BusinessWeek, images of rebuilding after Hurricane Sandy

See also 
 Recycled glass countertops

Sustainable building
Building materials companies of the United States
Companies based in New York City
B Lab-certified corporations